Chozi may refer to:

Chozi, Zambia, a small town in northeastern Zambia
Chozi River, a river of northeastern Zambia